Dimas is a Greek, Portuguese and Spanish surname derived from the biblical Saint Dimas. It is the surname of:

 Angger Dimas (born 1988), Indonesian electronic musician.
 Christos Dimas (born 1980), Greek politician.
 Emanuel Dimas de Melo Pimenta (born 1957), Brazilian musician and architect.
 Eva Dimas (born 1973), Salvadoran weightlifter.
  Dare Dimas Lugard (born 13 April 1986), Nigerian public health practitioner, writer and a politician who contested and lost state legislative office in his native Gombe State in 2019. An indigene of Kaltungo Gombe state. Known for his unapologetic pro-Israel stand.  
 Irma Dimas (born 1986), Salvadoran model and beauty queen.
 José Romão Dimas (born 1930), Portuguese association footballer.
 Pedro Dimas (born 1934), Mexican musician and composer.
 Pyrros Dimas (born 1971), Greek weightlifter.
 Stavros Dimas (born 1941), Greek politician, government minister and European commissioner.
 Trent Dimas (born 1970), American Olympic gymnast.

See also
 Dimas (disambiguation)

Greek-language surnames
Surnames
Spanish-language surnames
Portuguese-language surnames